was a Japanese artist. He created Japanese lacquerware based on the Maki-e style. Jitoku attended the Japan Art Academy.

References

1871 births
1936 deaths
Japanese lacquerware artists
Imperial household artists